Anomoclausia is a genus of cyclopoid copepods in the family Anomoclausiidae, the sole genus of the family. There is one described species in Anomoclausia, A. indrehusae.

References

Cyclopoida